Santiago Martín Paiva Mattos (born 11 January 1999) is a Uruguayan professional footballer who plays as a striker for Argentine Primera División club Godoy Cruz.

Career
Paiva made his professional debut on 26 November 2017, coming on as a 62nd minute substitute for Ignacio González in a 5–0 loss against Liverpool Montevideo. On 5 May 2019, he scored his first two professional goals in a 4–3 win against Juventud. After trailing 2–3 till 65th minute, Paiva scored equalizing and winning goals to give his side all three points.

Following Danubio's relegation from top division after 2020 season, Paiva joined Cerro Largo on a season long loan deal.

In July 2022, Paiva joined Argentine Primera División club Godoy Cruz.

Career statistics

Club

References

External links
 

1999 births
Living people
Uruguayan footballers
Uruguayan expatriate footballers
Footballers from Montevideo
Association football forwards
Uruguayan Primera División players
Argentine Primera División players
Danubio F.C. players
Cerro Largo F.C. players
Godoy Cruz Antonio Tomba footballers
Uruguayan expatriate sportspeople in Argentina
Expatriate footballers in Argentina